Marjana Dademaša  (born As Marjana Ivanova-Jevsejeva 1982) is a Latvian politician. She is a member of Harmony and was a deputy of the 12th Saeima until her resignation in 2015 to pursue a career at Olainfarm. Since June 2017 she is a member of the municipal council of Daugavpils, the second largest city in the country.

References

External links
Saeima website

1982 births
Living people
Politicians from Daugavpils
Latvian people of Russian descent
Social Democratic Party "Harmony" politicians
Deputies of the 11th Saeima
Deputies of the 12th Saeima
Women deputies of the Saeima
University of Daugavpils alumni

21st-century Latvian women politicians